Roch Pinard,  (July 26, 1910 – April 23, 1974) was a Canadian politician.

Born in Nicolet, Quebec, he was a lawyer before being elected to the House of Commons of Canada in Quebec the riding of Chambly—Rouville in 1945 federal election. A Liberal, he was re-elected in the 1949 election and the 1953 election. From 1954 to 1957, he was the Secretary of State of Canada and in 1955 he was the Postmaster General (Acting).

Pinard was one of Canada's delegates to the Tenth session of the United Nations General Assembly, 1955–1956.

References

1910 births
1974 deaths
Liberal Party of Canada MPs
Members of the House of Commons of Canada from Quebec
Members of the King's Privy Council for Canada
Postmasters General of Canada